Arispe is a genus of snout moths described by Émile Louis Ragonot in 1891.

Species
Arispe cestalis (Hulst, 1886)
Arispe concretalis Ragonot, 1891
Arispe ovalis Ragonot, 1891

References

Pyralini
Pyralidae genera
Taxa named by Émile Louis Ragonot